The Association of German Pfandbrief Banks (vdp) is the interest group of the Pfandbrief (covered bond) banks. It represents the foremost financiers for residential and commercial construction as well as the state and its institution, vdp member institutions are also engaged in ship and aircraft finance. The bond banks associations takes the judicial form of an Eingetragener Verein (registered association). The association was named Verband deutscher Hypothekenbanken (association of hypothecation banks) until July 2005.

Organization 
The association represents 40 member institutions and it is one of the five members of the German Banking Industry Committee that is defining the standards of the German financing sector.

The bond banks association runs a number of subsidiaries for specialized task such as the "vdp Research GmbH" (vdpResearch), the "vdp Pfandbriefakademie GmbH" (Pfandbrief Academy), the "Hyp Real Estate Rating Services GmbH" (HypRating) and the "Hyp-Zert-Gesellschaft" that is certifying real estate agents to take part in the "Beleihungswertermittlungen mbH" (HypZert - mortgage estimates), with all of them located in Berlin.

References

External links 
 http://www.pfandbrief.de

Banking in Germany
Banking organizations